The Shungwaya Freedom Party was a political party in Kenya led by Ahmed Jeneby.

History
Based in Lamu, the party was dominated by the Bajuni. In the 1961 general elections it received 0.4% of the vote, winning one seat in the Legislative Council.

It was deregistered in 1967.

References

Defunct political parties in Kenya
1967 disestablishments in Kenya
Political parties disestablished in 1967
Indian diaspora in Kenya